Hotspot Ecosystems Research on the Margins of European Seas, or HERMES, was an international multidisciplinary project, from April 2005 to March 2009, that studied deep-sea ecosystems along Europe's deep-ocean margin.

The HERMES project was funded by the European Commission's Sixth Framework Programme, and was the predecessor to the HERMIONE project, which started in April 2009.

References 

Hydrology
Oceanography
Climate change and the environment